The 1949 Missouri Tigers football team was an American football team that represented the University of Missouri in the Big Seven Conference (Big 7) during the 1949 college football season. The team compiled a 7–4 record (5–1 against Big 7 opponents), finished in second place in the Big 7, and outscored all opponents by a combined total of 264 to 225. Don Faurot was the head coach for the 12th of 19 seasons. The team played its home games at Memorial Stadium in Columbia, Missouri.

The team's statistical leaders included Dick Braznell with 766 rushing yards and 1,128 yards of total offense, Phil Klein with 808 passing yards, Gene Ackerman with 621 receiving yards, and John Glorioso with 77 points scored.

Schedule

References

Missouri
Missouri Tigers football seasons
Missouri Tigers football